Jacob Christian Jacobsen (2 September 1811 – 30 April 1887), mostly known as J. C. Jacobsen, was a Danish industrialist and philanthropist best known for founding the brewery Carlsberg.

Biography
He had no formal academic or scientific training (although he had attended some lectures by Hans Christian Ørsted). In the 1840s, he had come to realise that production of beer, which had until then been done in numerous small breweries, now had to be based on the scientific method in order to be industrialized.

Starting in 1847, he established his brewery Carlsberg in Valby on the outskirts of Copenhagen, on a site where it has remained since. He named the brewery  after his son, Carl Jacobsen. Being extremely vigorous in the pursuit of producing high quality beer, he founded the Carlsberg Laboratory in 1875.

He took much interest in public affairs and supported the National Liberal Party – becoming gradually more conservative – both as a Member of Parliament for some periods between 1854 and 1871 and as a strong supporter of the Danish defense. He served on the Copenhagen City Council from 1843 to 1857. Moreover he was a well-known patron of the arts. After the fire of Frederiksborg Palace in 1859, he funded the reconstruction efforts.

In 1876, Jacobsen founded the Carlsberg Foundation which he endowed with a controlling stake in Carlsberg, due to family tensions. A reconciliation was however obtained in 1886.

His son Carl Jacobsen collected one of the largest private art collections during his time. It is now housed in the Ny Carlsberg Glyptotek, a museum founded by him in Copenhagen.

Personal life
Jacobsen was married to Laura Cathrine Holst (1819–1911) and was the father of  Carl Jacobsen (1842–1919). In 1879, he became an honorary doctor of the University of Copenhagen Faculty of Science and in 1884 he was bestowed Commander 1st class of the Order of the Dannebrog, a Danish order of chivalry.

See also
 Carlsberg Breweries
 Carlsberg Laboratory
 Carlsberg Foundation
Carlsberg (district)

References

Literature
 

Danish brewers
Danish industrialists
19th-century Danish businesspeople
19th-century Copenhagen City Council members
Danish company founders
Danish philanthropists
Businesspeople from Copenhagen
1811 births
1887 deaths
19th-century philanthropists
Knights of the Order of the Dannebrog
19th-century industrialists